Dr. Olavo Avelino Garcia Correia commonly known as Olavo Correia, is a Cape Verdean politician. He currently serves as the deputy prime minister, and Minister of Finance of Cape Verde since May 2016. He was the governor of Bank of Cape Verde from 1999 to 2004. In April 2022, Olavo Avelino Garcia Correia was named head of the board of governors of the ECOWAS Bank for Investment and Development (EBID). It was at the end of the 20th ordinary general meeting of the board of governors held in Lomé that this appointment was made. He replaces in this post the Minister of Economy and Finance of Benin Romuald Wadagni.

References 

Living people
Finance ministers of Cape Verde
Cape Verdean bankers
Year of birth missing (living people)